The 2012 Torneo Descentralizado de Fútbol Profesional (known as the 2012 Copa Movistar for sponsorship reasons) is the ninety-sixth season of Association Peruvian football. A total of 16 teams competed in the tournament, with Juan Aurich as the defending champion. The Torneo Descentralizado began on February 19 and ended on December 9, 2012.

Competition modus
The season was divided into 3 stages. In the first stage 16 teams play a round-robin home-and-away round for a total of 30 matches each. In the second stage the 16 teams were divided into 2 groups. In addition, the team ranked first at the end of the first stage was eligible to play the 2013 Copa Libertadores as Peru 3. Each team carried their records from the first stage into the second stage. Both groups played another round-robin home-and-away round for 14 matches. Bonus points were awarded to two teams based on the performance of their reserve teams in the 2012 Torneo de Promoción y Reserva before the first match of the second stage. The teams ranked first in each group at the end of the 14 matches advanced to the third stage. The two teams with the fewest points at the end of the second stage were relegated. In the third stage the championship was contested in a two-legged Play-off. The Play-off finalists qualified for the Copa Libertadores. The remaining international competition berths were determined by the season aggregate table.

Teams
On 20 February 2012, Universidad San Martín, in protest of the ongoing players' strike, announced its definitive withdrawal from the tournament, the ADFP, and professional football. It also announced it would be closing its football club. On 14 March 2012, Universidad San Martín returned to the tournament and professional football.

Personnel and kits

Note: Flags indicate national team as has been defined under FIFA eligibility rules. Players may hold more than one non-FIFA nationality.

1 Cristian Arrasada acted as interem manager until Wilmar Valencia was eligible to manage when the Liguillas began.
2 Juan Chumpitaz acted as interem manager until Franco Navarro was eligible to manage when the Liguillas began.

Managerial changes

First stage

Standings

Results

Second stage
The Second Stage begins on 18 August and concludes 25 November. The winner of each Liguilla will qualify for the group stage of the 2013 Copa Libertadores.

Liguilla A

Standings

Results

Liguilla B

Standings

Results

Play-offs
The Third Stage will be the finals (also known as the Play-off) of the 2012 season between the winners of each group of the Second Stage. They will be played in December. The group winner with the most points on the aggregate table chooses which leg they will play as the home team. They will also choose the venue of the third match in case both teams are tied on points after the second leg.

Aggregate table
The aggregate table will determine the four teams who qualify to the 2013 Copa Sudamericana, one team to the 2013 Copa Libertadores if necessary, and the two teams to be relegated to the Segunda División. The aggregate table consists of the points earned in the First and Second stages.

Top goalscorers

Source: Soccerway
Last updated: To games played in Round 43

References

External links
  
Tournament regulations 

2012
1